Lucilia kunthiana is a species of daisy in the family Asteraceae.

References

Gnaphalieae